Monte Largo is a settlement in the southern part of the island of Fogo, Cape Verde. At the 2010 census its population was 274. Its elevation is about 800 meters.

See also
List of villages and settlements in Cape Verde

References

Villages and settlements in Fogo, Cape Verde
São Filipe, Cape Verde